Between Munich and St. Pauli or The Jolly Detectives ( or ) is a 1957 West German comedy crime film directed by Hermann Kugelstadt and starring Joe Stöckel, Beppo Brem and Ernst Waldow.

The film's sets were designed by the art director Hans Sohnle. It was shot on location around Munich and Hamburg.

Synopsis
Two recently retired Munich traffic policemen are bored and so decide to solve an open case in order to claim the reward. They join forces with a private detective who is also after the reward.

Cast
 Joe Stöckel as Alois Gallenmüller
 Beppo Brem as Toni Wimser
 Ernst Waldow as Willibald Knaake
 Lucie Englisch as Fanny Gallenmüller
 Ethel Reschke as Frau Hanselmann
 Vera Hösch as Christel Gallenmüller
 Peter Schwerdt as Kurt Knaake
 Wolfried Lier as Benno Weissmantel
 Ruth Lommel as Lilo Weissmantel
 Viktor Afritsch as Rufus Palmer
 Ruth Drexel as Urschel
 Rolf von Nauckhoff as Polizeikommissar in Hamburg
 Beppo Schwaiger as Polizeikommissar in München

References

Bibliography 
 Bergfelder, Tim & Bock, Hans-Michael. ''The Concise Cinegraph: Encyclopedia of German. Berghahn Books, 2009.

External links 
 

1957 films
West German films
German crime comedy films
1950s German-language films
Films directed by Hermann Kugelstadt
Films set in Munich
Films set in Hamburg
1950s crime comedy films
1950s German films